Sotenäs Municipality (Sotenäs kommun) is a municipality in Västra Götaland County in western Sweden. Its seat is located in the town of Kungshamn, with around 3,500 inhabitants.

The present municipality was created in 1974 through the amalgamation of previous units. The name was taken from the old Sotenäs Hundred.

Population figures

Approximate inhabitants of the larger population centres in the municipality. Source: Statistics Sweden (2002). They are here ordered after size.

Hovenäset 200
Ulebergshamn 300
Bohus-Malmön 400
Bovallstrand 500
Väjern 900
Smögen 1,400
Hunnebostrand 2,000
Kungshamn 3,000 (seat)

History

Västra Götaland County has been inhabited for several thousands of years. The province, Bohuslän, is among the internationally most known because of its pre-historical remains. The oldest remains in Sotenäs Municipality are from around 6000 BC. From the younger Stone Age are several burial monuments (dolmens). From the Bronze Age and Iron Age are many rock carvings, which the province also otherwise is noted for (especially the northern Tanum Municipality).

The name Sotenäs is believed to have originated from around 1000 AD, when also the first steps from the historical hundred, Sotenäs Hundred (or Härad in Swedish), can be traced.

With the Christianization of Sweden several churches were erected, starting in the 11th century. The first ones were the churches in Askum and Tossene.

Later, in the 16th century, the industry became dominated by fishing of herring. It dominated the industry for centuries; herring was used in large amounts in Bohuslän - as a basic food but also in the making of oil, wax candles, etc.

In the 19th century the island Malmön was started as a quarry. (Note that "Malm" means "rock" in Swedish). The quarry was kept alive and was of industrial significance until the 1930s.

The coat of arms was granted in 1977 and depicts a halibut. It is built on the insignia for Sotenäs Hundred and has been used for centuries.

References

External links

Sotenäs Municipality - Official site

Municipalities of Västra Götaland County
Gothenburg and Bohus